Life, by David E. Sadava et al., is a 1983 biological science textbook, under continual revision, used at many colleges and universities around the United States of America. As of 2016, it is in its eleventh edition with over 3500 pages. It is published by W.H. Freeman through MacMillan Learning.

References

External links 
 
Biology textbooks